Bryan William Redpath (born 2 July 1971 in Galashiels) is a former Scotland international rugby union player and former rugby union coach. He is currently the Director of Rugby at London Scottish.

Early life and family 
Redpath attended Kelso High School in Kelso, Scottish Borders. His son, Cameron Redpath, is also a Scotland international rugby union player.

Rugby playing career 
Redpath played professional rugby for Melrose RFC, Racing club de Narbonne Méditerranée in France, and Sale Sharks in England. Redpath won 60 caps for Scotland, captaining the team on a number of occasions. He appeared at three Rugby World Cups in 1995, 1999 and 2003.

Coaching career 
After retiring from playing, Redpath took on coaching roles. He was the backs' coach at Gloucester Rugby 2005 to 2009 before being promoted to Head Coach in June 2009. He resigned from his Gloucester role in 2012 and joined Sale Sharks. He was confirmed as the Director of Rugby post at Sale Sharks in June 2012. However, on 30 October 2012, Redpath was removed from his position to become Head Coach whilst Steve Diamond became new Director of Rugby. In March 2015, Redpath left Sale and took up the position of Head Coach for RFU Championship side Yorkshire Carnegie.

In January 2017, he announced that at the end of the season he was leaving rugby coaching roles to take up a job outside rugby.

He returned to coaching in 2022 when he was appointed Director of Rugby at London Scottish.

Professional career 
Since leaving the Rugby world, Bryan has taken up various roles in the deliverable Foreign Exchange Sector, working specifically with large multinational organisations, advising on bespoke FX Risk Management strategies. Most recently he has taken up the post of Head of Strategic Sales at Jackson Swiss Partners, one of the industry's fastest growing Start-Ups.

References

External links 
 
 Sporting Heroes
 Sale Sharks profile

1971 births
Living people
Melrose RFC players
People educated at Kelso High School, Scotland
Rugby union players from Galashiels
Rugby union scrum-halves
Sale Sharks players
Scotland international rugby union players
Scottish rugby union coaches
Scottish rugby union players